Calyciphora adamas is a species of moth from the Pterophoridae family. It is found in Portugal, Spain, southern France and Italy.

The larvae feed on Staehelina dubia.

References

Moths described in 1895
Pterophorini
Plume moths of Europe